The Miami Dolphins Honor Roll is a ring around the second tier at Hard Rock Stadium in Miami Gardens, Florida, which honors former players, coaches, contributors, and officials who have made significant contributions to the Miami Dolphins franchise.

The Miami Dolphins Honor Roll was started on September 16, 1990 with its first inductee being the owner/founder of the Miami Dolphins: Joe Robbie, who died one year prior to his induction.

Since then, 23 players, and two coaches have been inducted into the honor roll, along with a special induction to honor the 1972 Undefeated Team, which was inducted in 1992 at the 20th anniversary. Inductions included a special "four individual" induction in 1990 to honor the first four Miami Dolphins Hall of Famers of Csonka, Langer, Griese, and Warfield.

There have also been special "dual" inductions: In 2003, the "Marks Brothers" of WRs Mark Clayton and Mark Duper were inducted. In 2008, a special "dual" induction honored two members of the famed "Killer B's" defense with DT Bob Baumhower and DE Doug Betters. In 2010, a "dual" induction of two defensive stars on Miami's 1972 undefeated team - S Jake Scott and DE Bill Stanfill - were inducted. In 2012, a special "dual" induction of two all-time Dolphin fan-favorites, defensive stars from the mid-late 1990s/early 2000s - LB Zach Thomas and DE Jason Taylor - were also inducted.

In 1992 at the 20th anniversary, Miami's "1972 Undefeated Team" was enshrined into the Honor Roll. At the 40th anniversary, which enshrined former defensive coordinator Bill Arnsparger into the Honor Roll, his name went on the Honor Roll where the "1972 Undefeated Team" inductee previously and originally was enshrined, and an updated "1972 Perfect Season Team 17-0" inductee was put into one corner of Hard Rock Stadium with special placards of Super Bowl VII and Super Bowl VIII included next to it on each side.

Miami Dolphins Honor Roll inductees are chosen by current members of the honor roll as well as current franchise officials.

Inductees 

^ Jersey Number Retired
Bold indicates those enshrined into the Pro Football Hall of Fame

References

Miami Dolphins lists
Miami Gardens, Florida
1990 establishments in Florida
American football museums and halls of fame